The following are lists showing the point- and goal-scoring leaders of the National Hockey League before the league issued trophies for such achievements. The point-scoring leader has been awarded the Art Ross Trophy since the 1947–48 NHL season, and the goal-scoring leader has been awarded the Maurice "Rocket" Richard Trophy since the 1998–99 NHL season.

NHL point-scoring leaders (1918–1947)
These are the point-scoring leaders of the NHL from the league's first season (1917–18) until the 1946–47 season. Beginning with the 1947–48 NHL season, the point scoring leader was awarded the Art Ross Trophy.

NHL goal-scoring leaders (1918–1998)
These are the goal-scoring leaders of the NHL from the league's first season (1917–18) until the 1997–98 season. Beginning with the 1998–99 NHL season, the goal-scoring leader was awarded the Maurice "Rocket" Richard Trophy.

Notes

Scoring leaders
Scoring leaders